This is a list of monuments in Gorkha District, Nepal as officially recognized by and available through the website of the Department of Archaeology, Nepal. Gorkha is a district of Gandaki Province and is located in northern central Nepal. Royal palaces and Hindu temples are the main attraction of this district.

List of monuments

|}

See also 
 List of monuments in Gandaki Province
 List of monuments in Nepal

References 

Gorkha